Blue Spring can refer to:

Art and Entertainment 
 Blue Spring (manga), a manga by Taiyō Matsumoto
 Blue Spring (film), a 2001 film adapted from the above
 Blue Spring (album), a 1959 album by jazz trumpeter Kenny Dorham and saxophonist Cannonball Adderley

Geography 
Blue Spring (Madison County, Florida), a 1st magnitude spring
Blue Spring State Park, a 1st magnitude spring in Volusia County, Florida
Blue Spring, West Virginia, an unincorporated community

See also 
Blue Springs (disambiguation)